Bite the Bullet is a 1975 American Western film written, produced, and directed by Richard Brooks and starring Gene Hackman, Candice Bergen, and James Coburn, with Ian Bannen, Jan-Michael Vincent, Ben Johnson, and Dabney Coleman in supporting roles.

Plot
Based on actual events of the early twentieth century, the story concerns a grueling  cross-country horse race in 1906, with a winner-take-all prize of $2,000 ($ today), and the way it affects the lives of its various participants.

The fifteen colorful contestants include: two former Rough Riders named Clayton and Matthews who can't let friendship come between them if they intend to win; Miss Jones...a lady of little virtue; Carbo, a punk kid; Mister, an old cowhand in poor health; Sir Harry Norfolk, an English gentleman who's competing just for the sheer sport of it all; and a Mexican with a toothache who literally needs to bite the bullet. All must race against a thoroughbred of championship pedigree owned by Parker, a wealthy man who has no intention of seeing his entry lose.

The film touches on the themes of sportsmanship, animal cruelty, the yellow press, racism, the end of the Old West and the bonds of marriage and friendship. As the race progresses, the conditions test not only the endurance of horses and riders but also their philosophies of life and the meaning of victory and defeat.

When Miss Jones helps free her beau from a railway chain gang, they steal the contestants' horses and attempt to escape. The convicts are pursued and the riders get their mounts back, and the race is able to continue. Miss Jones, now free of her former boyfriend's malevolent influence, rides away into the countryside.

In the end, with all but three of the contestants knocked out of the race, Clayton and Matthews cross the finish line together as co-champions, beating the championship thoroughbred by a matter of minutes to win the prize money, plus any side bets they had placed.

Cast

Production

Charles Bronson turned down the lead role of Sam Clayton before Gene Hackman was eventually cast. The movie was filmed on location in New Mexico and Nevada and begins in a church in the small town of La Puente, New Mexico. There are numerous scenes of steam locomotives at work, shot along the Cumbres and Toltec Scenic Railroad narrow gauge railway between Chama, New Mexico, and Antonito, Colorado. Other scenes were filmed at the Carson National Forest, New Mexico; Taos, New Mexico; White Sands National Park, New Mexico; Lake Mead, Nevada; Valley of Fire State Park, Nevada. The film's title comes from the creation of an improvised cap made from a pistol cartridge casing ("bullet"), which is used to relieve the toothache of one of the participants in the horse race.

Factual inspiration
While the film's race is set in 1906, producer/writer/director Richard Brooks detailed that he was inspired by an actual $2,500 ($ today),  race, in 1908, created by the Denver Post (Western Post in the film), from Wyoming to Denver, Colorado.

Awards
Bite the Bullet was nominated for two Academy Awards including Best Sound (Arthur Piantadosi, Les Fresholtz, Richard Tyler, Al Overton Jr.) and Best Music, Original Score (Alex North).

Reception

Box office
According to Variety the film earned $5 million in theatrical rentals at the North American box office.

Critical
Vincent Canby of The New York Times was not impressed: "(It) is a big, expensive Western that doesn't contain one moment that might be called genuine. In spite of all the care, the money and the hardships that apparently went into its production, the movie looks prefabricated, like something assembled from other people's earlier, better inspirations." Canby did find the cinematography by Harry Stradling Jr. to be "spectacularly beautiful."

However, Roger Ebert of the Chicago Sun-Times liked the film: "Brooks is a proven master of the Western on a grand scale (the 1966 classic The Professionals was his) and Bite the Bullet is a film that reexamines and reaffirms the Western myth — both as it affected our history and as it has been considered in the movies. ...Bite the Bullet finds the traditional power and integrity of the Western intact after all." Likewise, Ebert was impressed with Stradling's cinematography.

See also
 List of American films of 1975

References

External links

Roger Ebert review, Bite the Bullet

1975 films
1975 Western (genre) films
American Western (genre) films
Columbia Pictures films
1970s English-language films
Films scored by Alex North
Films directed by Richard Brooks
Films set in Nevada
Films shot in Nevada
Films shot in New Mexico
Films shot in Colorado
American horse racing films
Films set in 1906
1970s chase films
1970s American films